Charles Guthrie is the athletic director at the University of Akron. He previously held the same position at University of Wisconsin-Green Bay, San Francisco State University, and Clark College.

Early life and education
Guthrie grew up in Albany, New York. He played basketball at Onondaga Community College before transferring and earning a B.A. s from Syracuse University and a master’s degree in education administration and policy studies from the University at Albany.

Career
Guthrie began his career in 1998 as an intern at Eastern College Athletic Conference (ECAC) in Cape Cod, Massachusetts. In 2004, he completed the NCAA Fellows Leadership Development Program. After stops at Colgate University, Columbia University, Cal State San Marcos, University of California, San Diego and California State University, Los Angeles, he landed his first AD position in 2011 at Clark College in Vancouver, Washington. Under his leadership, 10 of 11 sports programs at Clark College made post-season appearances in 2013.

He then served as the athletic director of the San Francisco State Gators from 2014 to 2017.  Guthrie’s tenure as the head of the Gators athletic department was a short one, but he accomplished a great deal in that time.  Annual giving doubled during his tenure and Guthrie was also successful in securing a $2 million gift, the largest one-time individual gift to San Francisco State athletics.

Additionally, the 2016-17 season men’s basketball team finished with a record of 25-6, their best since 1940. 

In 2017, Guthrie was named the 9th athletic director at University of Wisconsin-Green Bay, where he was responsible for managing 14 NCAA Division I athletic programs as a member of the Horizon League Conference. He hired men’s basketball coach Will Ryan in 2020.

In 2021, he was hired by former Green Bay chancellor Gary Miller to lead the Akron Zips. During his first year with the Zips, the four teams won MAC Championships, hired Oregon Ducks offensive coordinator Joe Moorhead as the football head coach, and the basketball team won the Mid-American Conference Championship to earn a March Madness berth against UCLA.

References

External links
 Biography at Akron Zips Athletics Website
 Biography at Lead1 Association 
 Guthrie on the Daily Orange Podcast in 2022

1967 births
Living people
Akron Zips athletic directors
California State University people
California State University, Los Angeles people
Colgate University people
Columbia University staff
Eastern College Athletic Conference
Maxwell School of Citizenship and Public Affairs alumni
Onondaga Community College alumni
San Francisco State Gators athletic directors
Sportspeople from Albany, New York
University of California, San Diego administrators
University at Albany, SUNY alumni
University of Wisconsin–Green Bay people